Isoetes nuttallii, or Nuttall's quillwort, is a species of quillwort, a type of lycopod. It is native to shallow waters and other wet habitats of western North America from British Columbia to California. It produces up to 60 pointed, cylindrical, green to gray-green leaves, each 7 to 17 centimeters long. The velum completely covers the spherical sporangia, which are 5 millimeters long and 1.5 millimeters wide. The ligule is small and triangular. The megaspores are 400 to 500 micrometers in diameter. The microspores, which are spiny and covered in tubercles, are 28 to 31 micrometers long.

References

External links
Jepson Manual Treatment
USDA Plants Profile
Photo gallery

nuttallii
Flora of British Columbia
Flora of Washington (state)
Flora of Oregon
Flora of California
Taxa named by Alexander Braun